Afterschool Sound Records is the name of an American record label. The label operates on behalf of El Saturn Records and features a number of artists from the University of Chicago.

See also 
List of Record Labels

External links 
 Afterschool Sound Records

American record labels